Dolní Beřkovice is a municipality and village in Mělník District in the Central Bohemian Region of the Czech Republic. It has about 1,500 inhabitants.

Administrative parts
Villages of Podvlčí and Vliněves are administrative parts of Dolní Beřkovice.

References

Villages in Mělník District